Scarborough—Guildwood is a provincial electoral district in Toronto, Ontario, Canada, that has been represented in Legislative Assembly of Ontario since the 2007 provincial election.

It was created in 2003 from parts of Scarborough East, Scarborough Southwest and Scarborough Centre.

It is centred on the Guildwood neighbourhood.   It consists of the part of the City of Toronto bounded by a line drawn from Lake Ontario north along Markham Road, west along Eglinton Avenue, north along Bellamy Road South, west along Lawrence Avenue, north along McCowan Road, east along Highway 401, south along Morningside Avenue back to Lake Ontario.

Members of Provincial Parliament

Election results

	

	
	

	

		

|align="left" colspan=2|Liberal notional hold
|align="right"|Swing
|align="right"| -4.02
|

^ Change based on redistributed result

2007 electoral reform referendum

References

External links
Elections Ontario Past Election Results
Map of riding for 2018 election

Ontario provincial electoral districts
Provincial electoral districts of Toronto
Scarborough, Toronto